Jhalakathi Government High School is a secondary school in Jhalokati Sadar Upazila, Jhalokati District, Bangladesh. It was established in 1909.

The school was built near the Sugandha River, but river erosion spoiled this historic school, and a new two story school building was later built near the old one. The school has a playground, with a square pond in front. There is also a large coconut garden.

History
By the great effort of some affluent businessmen a school named Moharajgong was established in 1872. The school was nationalized on 3 March 1909 for the chronological and educational development by the then British Government. It was the first government school on the bank of Sugandha that was established in the Indo-British period among the Thana level in 1909. The "H" shaped tinshed building was built by using the loha ket. In the pass age of time the school compound was washed away by river erosion of Sugandha. According to the modern plan the school building, playground, headmaster's quarter, a mosque and student's hostel were constructed and the educational activities in the new building were started in 1974. The centennial celebration of the school was held on 3 January 2008 and a new school gate containing a sundial was built.

School hours 
There are two shift at this school. Morning shift starts at 07:30 am and ends 11.40 am. Day shift starts at 12:00 pm and ends at 5:00 am ( except 4 pm on Thursdays ).

Gallery

References

Jhalokati District
High schools in Bangladesh
1909 establishments in India
Educational institutions established in 1909